"One Honest Heart" is a song written by David Malloy, Gary Baker and Frank J. Myers, and recorded by American country music artist Reba McEntire. It was released on March 30 1999 as the fourth and final single from her album, If You See Him.  The song reached #7 on the Billboard Hot Country Singles & Tracks chart in July 1999.

She promoted the song by singing it on A&E's Reba Live by Request and the 1999 Academy of Country Music Awards.

Chart performance

Year-end charts

References

1999 singles
1998 songs
Reba McEntire songs
Songs written by Gary Baker (songwriter)
Songs written by Frank J. Myers
Songs written by David Malloy
MCA Nashville Records singles
Song recordings produced by David Malloy